Christian Democracy for the Autonomies (DCA) was a minor Christian-democratic political party in Italy.

History
DCA was founded on 25 October 2004 by a split from the Union of Christian and Centre Democrats (UDC) led by Gianfranco Rotondi, who wanted closer ties with Silvio Berlusconi's Forza Italia and who criticised the political line of the then-leader of UDC Marco Follini. The party became part of the centre-right coalition following its foundation.

The party was part of the House of Freedoms coalition in the 2006 general election, competing the election in an electoral list with the New Italian Socialist Party. The joint list gained 0.7% of the votes and, despite not having passed the 2% threshold, it still elected four deputies since it was the party which received more votes under the 2% in its coalition. Two of these deputies were members of DCA, while two more candidates were elected on the list of Forza Italia. Gianfranco Rotondi was too elected Senator on the list of Forza Italia, along with his colleague and deputy Mario Cutrufo.

DCA was part of The People of Freedom (PdL) list for the 2008 general election. On 3 April 2008, during a meeting in Milan, the party announced an alliance within the new party with the Liberal Populars of Carlo Giovanardi. After the election, in which the party got three deputies and one senator elected, Gianfranco Rotondi joined the Berlusconi IV Cabinet as Minister without portfolio.

In 2009 the DCA was eventually merged into the PdL and its members launched a network of circles named after the party's newspaper, La Discussione, led by Giampiero Catone. In October 2012, the balance of accounts of the People of Freedom showed that DCA had received €96,000 of financial support from PdL.

Leadership
Secretary: Gianfranco Rotondi (2005–2009)
Deputy-Secretary: Mauro Cutrufo (2005–2009)
Organization Secretary: Giampiero Catone (2005–2009)
President: Publio Fiori (2005–2006)

Symbols

External links
Official website
La Discussione circles

References

Defunct political parties in Italy
Catholic political parties
Christian democratic parties in Italy
Political parties established in 2005
2005 establishments in Italy
2009 disestablishments in Italy
Political parties disestablished in 2009